56–58 Queen's Gate Terrace is a pair of Grade II listed houses in Queen's Gate Terrace, Kensington, London SW7, built in 1863–65 by the architect Charles Gray.

The ground floor of number 58 also has an entrance on 15 Gloucester Road, and is occupied by the Da Mario Pizzeria.

References

External links

Grade II listed buildings in the Royal Borough of Kensington and Chelsea
Kensington